Alexander Richard Thompson (1 December 1876 – 16 December 1951) was an English cricketer active from 1905 to 1908 who played for Northamptonshire (Northants). He was born in Stamford, Lincolnshire, and appeared in seventeen first-class matches as a righthanded batsman who scored 358 runs with a highest score of 48 not out.  He died in Durban, Natal, South Africa, aged 75.

Notes

1876 births
1951 deaths
English cricketers
Northamptonshire cricketers